Tetralofo is a village and a community of the Kozani municipality. Before the 2011 local government reform it was part of the municipality of Ellispontos, of which it was a municipal district. The 2011 census recorded 320 inhabitants in the community. The community of Tetralofo covers an area of 25.199 km2.

See also
List of settlements in the Kozani regional unit

References

Populated places in Kozani (regional unit)